Walter Leslie Ware (19 March 1906 – 15 January 1994) was an Australian rules footballer who played with Hawthorn in the Victorian Football League (VFL).

Originally from Sale, Victoria, his younger brother Norman Ware, played and coached Footscray, winning the Brownlow Medal in 1941.

References

External links

1906 births
1994 deaths
Australian rules footballers from Victoria (Australia)
Hawthorn Football Club players
Sale Football Club players
People from Sale, Victoria